Gilbert Ray McGregor (born June 14, 1949) is an American former professional basketball player. He played in the National Basketball Association for the Cincinnati Royals during the 1971–72 season.

Broadcasting career
McGregor was a sportscaster for the Charlotte Hornets and New Orleans Hornets.

References

External links
Charlotte Hornets biography

1949 births
Living people
American radio sports announcers
American television sports announcers
American expatriate basketball people in Belgium
American expatriate basketball people in France
American expatriate basketball people in Italy
American men's basketball players
Charlotte Hornets announcers
Cincinnati Royals draft picks
Cincinnati Royals players
College basketball announcers in the United States
College football announcers
New Orleans Hornets announcers
Power forwards (basketball)
Virginia Squires draft picks
Wake Forest Demon Deacons men's basketball players
Wilkes-Barre Barons players